is an anime television series by Studio Fantasia and Amber Film Works. It aired in Japan from October to December 2001. The series is similar to that of Agent Aika, both being directed by Katsuhiko Nishijima and animated by Studio Fantasia, with much of the same content.

Story
Najica Hiiragi is a noted perfumer for CRI Cosmetics, famous for being able to identify over 500 scents. Secretly, however, she is actually a field agent for CRI's Intelligence Bureau, an agency unknown to the public and even to most of its own employees for the sake of their own protection.

Najica is assigned the mission to recover a gynoid known as a Humaritt code-named "ZZZ" and referred to as "Lila". Najica becomes suspicious when CRI Intelligence is contracted by Shinba Industrial to recover more lost and possibly rogue Humaritts; especially since most of them are in the hands of criminals, revolutionaries, guerrillas or terrorist groups. Her suspicions increase when Lila is assigned to be her partner, even though Najica insists she be allowed to continue working alone. As time goes on, however, Najica begins to trust Lila, even if Lila's lack of social graces make her wince.

Characters
  is the title character. She is a world-class perfume maker by day at CRI Cosmetics and a special agent for CRI's Intelligence Bureau. She works to develop cosmetics with her assistant Kirala as well as partake in missions given to her by the company. All of her missions are received with a single rose. 
  is a gynoid known as a Humaritt code-named "ZZZ" who was rescued from a bisexual countess. She becomes Najica's partner for the series. Although at first, her lack of social grace irritates Najica, the two eventually care for one another. 
  is the CRI head and Najica's commander. He is usually seen with Gento during a mission briefing. 
  is a brown-haired secretary working for the CRI. 
  is a green-haired secretary working for the CRI. 
  is often Najica's informant when it comes to missions involving Humaritts. He is in love with her, and he often tries to ask her out or hit on her. 
  is Najica's assistant. She is currently working with her to perfect "The Day Series" of perfumes.

Theme music
 Opening theme "Najica", by Diligent Circle of Ekoda

 Ending theme "Body & Mind", by Natsumi Harada

Broadcast
The Najica anime television series premiered on Television Kanagawa the Thursday broadcast night of October 4, 2001 at 25:40 (October 5, 2001 at 1:40am) with broadcasts on Chiba Television Broadcasting and Television Saitama the following night. It was broadcast on Kids Station the following Thursday at 23:30, starting October 11. During the week of November 15, the first three channels did not air a new episode. Starting with episode 7 on November 22, the Kids Station Thursday night broadcast then preceded TV Kanagawa's broadcast, with the final episode airing on December 27, 2001.

Episode list

Reception

Notes

References

Further reading

External links
 Official website 
 

2001 anime television series debuts
2002 manga
Action anime and manga
ADV Films
Anime with original screenplays
Science fiction anime and manga
Seinen manga
Studio Fantasia